Abdullah Karim is an Australian powerchair football player who plays as a forward.

Career

Karim represented Australia at the 2017 FIFPA World Cup, helping them achieve 4th place, their highest finish. He was Most Valuable Player at the 2017 FIFPA World Cup.

References

External links
 Abdullah Karim at Powerchair Sports Victoria

Australian disabled sportspeople
Living people
Sportspeople with disabilities
Year of birth missing (living people)